Cantillana is a town located in the province of Seville, Andalusia, southern Spain.

Energy

Solar: 3.78 MW h solar farm (bannered by Prodiel.com) on the train station side of the Guadalquivir river, facing an electric substation served by delegates of Elecnor, Endesa, Imesa, Ingersol and Cabelte.

Petrochemical: Repsol fuel stations mark Cantillana (24/7) and neighbouring Cantillana la Montana.

Roman Mosaic

Excavated approximately 1.8 metres below the current residential surface, near the Church of Asuncion. The mosaic features a full image of sea creatures surrounding a mosaiced water well.

References

Notable people from Cantillana
Abu Madyan
José Pérez Ocaña

External links
Cantillana - Sistema de Información Multiterritorial de Andalucía

Municipalities of the Province of Seville